Clavulina ramosior is a species of coral fungus in the family Clavulinaceae. It occurs in Africa.

References

External links

Fungi described in 1966
Fungi of Africa
ramosior